The QCA Corporate Governance Code is a corporate governance code published by the Quoted Companies Alliance (QCA).

It is the corporate governance code adopted by the majority of companies on the AIM market in the UK. London Stock Exchange rules allow companies on AIM to choose which code they adopt and referenced two options as "recognised corporate governance codes". These are:
 The QCA Corporate Governance Code
 The UK Corporate Governance Code

A review of all 927 companies on AIM at the end of 2018 showed that 89% had chosen to apply the QCA Corporate Governance Code, with 6% applying the UK Corporate Governance Code, and 5% applying a range of other codes.

References

External links
 QCA: The QCA Corporate Governance Code
 London Stock Exchange: Inside AIM: Preparation for Corporate Governance Changes
 OECD: Flexibility and Proportionality in Corporate Governance
 QCA/UHY Hacker Young: Corporate Governance Behaviour Review 2018/19
 ICSA: The new governance code requirement for AIM companies
 EY: Update on the new QCA Corporate Governance Code
 Lewis Silkin: The new 2018 QCA Corporate Governance Code for small & mid-size quoted companies
 Thomson Reuters: QCA Corporate Governance Code
 London Stock Exchange: Corporate Governance for Main Market and AIM companies (2012)
 Burgess Salmon: Small-cap corporate governance: new QCA Code
 Deloitte: Governance Brief